Olinger is an unincorporated community in Lee County, Virginia, in the United States.

History
A post office was established at Olinger in 1891, and remained in operation until it was discontinued in 1957. The community was named for the locally prominent Olinger family.

References

Unincorporated communities in Lee County, Virginia
Unincorporated communities in Virginia